Lloyd Nicholas Trefethen  (born 30 August 1955) is an American mathematician, professor of numerical analysis and head of the Numerical Analysis Group at the Mathematical Institute, University of Oxford.

Education
Trefethen was born 30 August 1955 in Boston, Massachusetts, the son of mechanical engineer Lloyd M. Trefethen and codebreaker, poet, teacher and editor Florence Newman Trefethen.

He obtained his bachelor's degree from Harvard University in 1977 and his master's from Stanford University in 1980. His PhD was on Wave Propagation and Stability for Finite Difference Schemes supervised by Joseph E. Oliger at Stanford University.

Career and research
Following his PhD, Trefethen went on to work at the Courant Institute of Mathematical Sciences in New York, Massachusetts Institute of Technology, and Cornell University, before being appointed to a chair at the University of Oxford and a Fellowship of Balliol College, Oxford.

, he has published around 150 journal papers spanning a wide range of areas within numerical analysis and applied mathematics, including non-normal eigenvalue problems and applications, spectral methods for differential equations, numerical linear algebra, fluid mechanics, computational complex analysis, and approximation theory. He is perhaps best known for his work on pseudospectra of non-normal matrices and operators. This work covers theoretical aspects as well as numerical algorithms, and applications including fluid mechanics, numerical solution of partial differential equations, numerical linear algebra, shuffling of cards, random matrices, differential equations and lasers. Trefethen is currently an ISI highly cited researcher.

Trefethen has written a number of books on numerical analysis including Numerical Linear Algebra with David Bau, Spectral Methods in MATLAB, Schwarz–Christoffel Mapping  with Tobin Driscoll, and Spectra and Pseudospectra: The Behavior of Nonnormal Matrices and Operators with Mark Embree. He is the leader of the MATLAB-based Chebfun software project.

In 2013 he proposed a new formula to calculate the BMI of a person:

 

(International System of Units)

Books
 Numerical Linear Algebra (SIAM, 1997) with David Bau
 Spectral Methods in Matlab (SIAM, 2000)
 Schwarz-Christoffel Mapping (Cambridge, 2002) with T. A. Driscoll
 Spectra and Pseudospectra: The Behavior of Nonnormal Matrices and Operators (Princeton, 2005) with Mark Embree
 Trefethen's Index Cards (World Scientific 2011)
 Approximation Theory and Approximation Practice (SIAM, 2013 and 2020)
 Exploring ODEs (SIAM, 2018) with Á. Birkisson and T. A. Driscoll
 An Applied Mathematician’s Apology (SIAM, 2022)

Awards and honours
Trefethen was the first winner of the Leslie Fox Prize for Numerical Analysis. In 1998 he was an Invited Speaker of the International Congress of Mathematicians in Berlin. He is a fellow of the American Mathematical Society, and a member of the National Academy of Engineering in the United States. Trefethen was elected a Fellow of the Royal Society (FRS) in 2005, and his certificate of election reads:

In 2010 Trefethen was awarded the Gold Medal of the Institute of Mathematics and its Applications in recognition of his "outstanding contributions to mathematics and its applications over a period of years".
In 2013 Trefethen was awarded the Naylor Prize and lectureship in Applied Mathematics from the London Mathematical Society.  He was awarded the George Pólya Prize for Mathematical Exposition in 2017 and the John von Neumann
Prize in 2020 by SIAM.

Personal life
Trefethen has one son and one daughter from his first marriage to Anne Elizabeth Trefethen (née Daman).  He is currently married to Kate McLoughlin, a professor of English Literature at Oxford.

References

External links
 
 
 

Fellows of the Royal Society
Numerical analysts
20th-century British mathematicians
21st-century British mathematicians
Living people
Harvard University alumni
Stanford University alumni
1955 births
Fellows of the American Mathematical Society
Fellows of Balliol College, Oxford
Fellows of the Society for Industrial and Applied Mathematics
Members of the United States National Academy of Engineering
Presidents of the Society for Industrial and Applied Mathematics
Courant Institute of Mathematical Sciences faculty
Nick